Naipes Heraclio Fournier S.A. is a well known Spanish playing card manufacturer based in Vitoria and which has its factory in Legutio (Spain). This company is property of the United States Playing Card Company, which is a subsidiary of the Turnhout, Belgium–based Cartamundi.

History
In 1785 Francisco Fournier went to live to Burgos. He was French. He married a wealthy Spanish woman called Maria de Reoyo. They had a son called Lazaro Fournier. Lazaro married another Spanish woman called Paula González. They had four children. The youngest was born on 2 March 1849 and he was called Heraclio Fournier González.

The young Heraclio Fournier started working in the factory of his brother Braulio Fournier. The factory was called "Fournier hermanos". They created a new type of playing card, which became famous in a short period of time. Due to the success that they had had, they decided to separate themselves and they started working alone.

After that Heraclio decided to go to live to Vitoria-Gasteiz. In 1870 he created a little lithography factory, it was called "Naipes Heraclio Fournier". This factory was created with the aim of being a playing card manufacturer. Later Heraclio started to make different types of stamps and to print books. As he had had with his previous work, he had a great success in Vitoria too.

In 1875 Heraclio created new printing ways and new graphic models. Two years later he worked with a Spanish art teacher called Emilio Soubrier and a painter called Diaz de Olano to design a new brand of playing cards. That was going to be the first brand of his famous Spanish playing cards. In 1880 he changed his work place to a bigger one in Fueros street.

Next years he travelled a lot of times to France to improve his manufacture. In 1889 he won a prize in the exposition universelle of Paris. One year later he decided to change his actual playing cards to a new deck of cards which had 12 different colours. After the changes he won a lot of prizes in Paris, Madrid, Barcelona etc.

In 1916 Heraclio Fournier died in Vichy. He had no male descendants and because of that his grandson Félix Alfaro Fournier became the owner of the company. Félix started a playing card collection. In 1970, after buying the cards of Thomas De la Rue, he opened a museum called "Museo Fournier de Naipes".

In 1948 Naipes Heraclio Fournier company was the best playing card manufacturer in Spain. In 1986 the company United States Playing Card company bought Naipes Heraclio Fournier.

Nowadays the company sells 16 million packs a year. It sells them to many casinos around the world, being one of the most important playing card manufacturers in the world.

In 1986 it was acquired by the US Playing Card Company, entering a conglomerate where other brands such as Bicycle, Aviator, Bee and KEM are located.

In 1993, it continues to increase its presence in the international market. This transformation forces them to move to their final location, a large warehouse with adequate facilities to meet the growing demand. It has obtained the certificate ISO 9001 - 2000 (Lloyd's Register Quality Assurance) to the quality of the production process.

Products
The company produces many different types of cards.

 Poker and Bridge playing cards: The most used playing cards in casinos. The company sells around 6 million packs a year.
 Spanish playing cards: The most famous cards of Fournier. The company sells around 10 million packs a year.
 Tarot playing cards.
 Trading cards: Fantasy art cards, children's card games, advertising themed cards, sports cards.

References

External links

 Homepage 

1868 establishments in Spain
Basque companies
Companies established in 1868
Manufacturing companies of Spain
Playing card manufacturers
Vitoria-Gasteiz
Spanish brands